HMS Harwich was a 50-gun fourth rate ship of the line of the English Royal Navy, launched at Deptford in 1695.

The Harwich was one of four ships sent to Madagascar on an anti-piracy mission under Thomas Warren in 1699.

The Harwich was wrecked in November 1699 while careening in China.

Notes

References

Lavery, Brian (2003) The Ship of the Line - Volume 1: The development of the battlefleet 1650-1850. Conway Maritime Press. .
Winfield, Rif (2009) British Warships in the Age of Sail 1603-1714: Design, Construction, Careers and Fates. Seaforth Publishing. .

Ships of the line of the Royal Navy
1690s ships
Ships involved in anti-piracy efforts